Jaffrey Airport–Silver Ranch is a public use airport in Cheshire County, New Hampshire, United States. It is owned by the Jaffrey Municipal Airport Development Corp. and is located one nautical mile (1.85 km) southeast of the central business district of Jaffrey, New Hampshire. It is included in the Federal Aviation Administration (FAA) National Plan of Integrated Airport Systems for 2017–2021, in which it is categorized as a general aviation facility.

Facilities and aircraft 
It has one asphalt / turf runway designated 16/34 with a surface measuring 2,982 by 134 feet (909 x 41 m).

For the 12-month period ending 31 December 2013, the airport had 7,300 aircraft operations, an average of 20 per day: 86% general aviation, 12% air taxi, and 1% military. At that time there were 17 aircraft based at this airport: 65% single-engine, 6% multi-engine, 12% helicopters and 18% ultralights.

References

External links 
 Aerial photo as of 13 April 1998 from USGS The National Map
 
 

Airports in New Hampshire
Transportation buildings and structures in Cheshire County, New Hampshire
Jaffrey, New Hampshire